Blue Magic can refer to:

 Blue Magic (band), a R&B and soul music vocal quintet
 Blue Magic (album)
"Blue Magic" (song), a song from rapper Jay-Z's album American Gangster
Blue Magic, a novel by A. M. Dellamonica
Blue Magic, a novel by Edith Ballinger Price
The name of a high quality brand of heroin marketed by drug lord Frank Lucas, which later inspired the film American Gangster and the song of the same name by Jay-Z.

Others
 A type of magic in the Final Fantasy video game; see Final Fantasy magic
 Blue Magic is the name of the Direct to Home venture by Reliance ADAG
 "Magic blue" refers to the chemical compound Tris(4-bromophenyl)ammoniumyl hexachloroantimonate